The 2018–19 Azerbaijan Basketball League, is the 26th season of the top professional basketball league in Azerbaijan.

Competition format
The six clubs played a four-legged round robin tournament where the four first qualified teams would advance to the playoffs.

Regular season

League table

Results

Playoffs
The semi-finals were played in a best-of-three playoff format and the finals in a best-of-five playoff format (1-1-1-1-1).

Bracket

Semi-finals

|}

Finals

|}

Third place series

|}

References

External links
Azeri league at Eurobasket.com

Azerbaijan
Basketball
Basketball
Basketball in Azerbaijan